Maythil Radhakrishnan aka Rad Maythil (born 24 July 1944), popularly known as Maythil, born in Pudiyankom (Alathur, Palakkad district of Kerala), is an all-rounder in Malayalam literature, who writes poetry and fiction as well as non-fiction. He was chosen for the Kerala Sahitya Academi Award for Overall Contributions in 2016 which he subsequently refused.

Biography 
Maythil graduated in Economics from Kerala University in 1968. For the next eight years, he researched insect ethology, while working as a freelance journalist. From 1976 to 1984 he worked in Kuwait for a Norwegian shipping firm as EDP Coordinator. For the next three years, he ran his own computer aided design and drafting center in Coimbatore, Tamil Nadu. Since 1987, except for a four-year stint as Editor for Youth Express of The New Indian Express (then The Indian Express) group, at Trivandrum and Chennai, Maythil has spent his time mostly in writing; on occasions working as a freelance journalist, quizmaster and a web developer. He writes popular columns in The Sunday Express (Zebra Crossing, now available online as a social network created by the author ) and in Madhyamam Weekly (Moonnu Vara a.k.a. Three Stripes). Presently he lives in Trivandrum. He is a widower and has a daughter (June) and a son (Julian).

Writing
Maythil's first novel, Sooryavamsam, published in 1970, announced the arrival of a major talent in Malayalam literature. Four novels and many stories and poems later, his is still a fresh voice. His oeuvre reflects the whole gamut of unrelated experience—from computers to insects—that he had acquired. The essence of his writing is summed up by K. Satchidanandan in the following words:
There are very few in Indian fiction who can compare with this author in artistic innovation, intellectual subtlety and original perception of things and of life. The three novellas here represent all that is newest in Indian fiction.

Maythil was awarded the 2015 annual award for his contributions to Malayalam literature by Kerala Sahitya Akademi in 2016 which he refused, citing his distrust in academies.

Bibliography

Novels
Sooryavamsam (Sun Dynasty), novel, 1970
Bra, novel, 1974
Chuvanna Vidooshakarute Anchampathi (Fifth Column of the Red Jesters), novel, 1974
Hitchcockinte Itapetal (Hitchcock's Intervention), novel, 1994
Laingikathayekkurichu Oru Upanyasam (An Essay on Sexuality), novel, 1995

Poetry
Penguin, poems, 1973
Bhoomiyeyum Maranatheyum Kurichu (Of The Earth and Death), poems, 1991

Short fiction
Naayakanmaar Shavapetakangalil (Heroes in Coffins), Short stories, 1994
Dylan Thomasinte Panth, (The Ball of Dylan Thomas) Short stories, 1994
Sangeetham Oru Samayakalayaanu (Music Is A Time-art), Short stories, 1995
Sooryamalsyathe vivarikkal(Describing the Sunfish), Novella, 2017

Collected works in English
The Love Song of Alfred Hitchcock, 2004
(Translated by VC Harris)

Collected works in Malayalam
Maythil Kathakal, Published by Mathrubhumi Books, 2013
Maythil Radhakrishnan - Pratikathakal: Vimatam, Published by DC Books, 2003

Non-fiction (Science)
Romam (Hair), 1981
Daivam, Manushyan, Yanthram (God, Man and Machine) 2001

References

External links

 

1944 births
Living people
Writers from Palakkad
Malayalam-language writers
20th-century Indian novelists
20th-century Indian poets
20th-century Indian short story writers
Novelists from Kerala
Poets from Kerala
Indian popular science writers